Gutay is a rural locality (an ulus) in Bichursky District, Republic of Buryatia, Russia. The population was 209 as of 2010. There are 4 streets.

Geography 
Gutay is located 39 km northeast of Bichura (the district's administrative centre) by road. Novosretenka is the nearest rural locality.

References 

Rural localities in Bichursky District